XIII Riigikogu was the thirteenth legislature of the Estonian Parliament (Riigikogu). The legislature was elected after 2015 election.

Election results

Officers
Speaker of the Riigikogu: Eiki Nestor.

List of members of the Riigikogu

References

Riigikogu